Cracolândia (literally Crackland in Portuguese) is a popular denomination for a region of the city of São Paulo, which is notorious for high incidence of drug trafficking and drug use in public. It is located within the central region of the city, near Luz Station.

Recent history 
Since 2005, the city hall has shut down bars and hotels associated with drug distribution and prostitution, displaced homeless people, and increased police presence with the intent to inhibit drug use in Cracolândia. Hundreds of building were designated as public utility in a 1.1 million square feet area, and were expropriated. The objective of the project was to increase the attractiveness of the region to private businesses.

In 2007, the São Paulo city hall launched a program named Nova Luz (New Light in Portuguese, referring to the broader region around Luz Station) in order to promote the execution of the planned changes to the region. Among the proposed measures were tax breaks, especially on real estate taxes, to stimulate the renewal of the facades of buildings, which are generally poorly maintained.

Critics of this program, however, claimed it to have a basis on social hygiene movements, highlighting that the renovations in buildings, parks, and streets were not accompanied by assistance towards the vulnerable groups who inhabit or work in the region, who are being effectively removed. The homeless are displaced, trash collectors have their job put in jeopardy, and crack users and dependents are left without a place to gather, being left to wander adjacent and otherwise nearby neighborhoods.

Depictions in pop culture 

Cracolândia is prominently featured in Verdades Secretas when a model becomes addicted to crack which leads to her eventually becoming homeless living in the area.

See also 

 Skid row

References

Neighbourhoods in São Paulo
Illegal drug trade in South America
Illegal drug trade in Latin America
Drugs in Brazil